Great Holcombe is a hamlet in Newington civil parish in South Oxfordshire, about  north of Wallingford.

References

Villages in Oxfordshire